Ballophilus peruanus is a species of centipede in the genus Ballophilus. It is found in Peru. The original description of this species is based on a specimen measuring 12 mm in length with 43 pairs of legs.

References 

Ballophilidae
Animals described in 1941